Bang Lamung may refer to:
 Bang Lamung District
 Bang Lamung township